Austin Carr (born 1948) is an American basketball player.

Austin Carr may also refer to:

Austin Carr (American football) (born 1993), American football player
Austin Carr (cricketer) (1898–1946), English cricketer